is a former Japanese football player. She played for Japan national team.

Club career
Hara was born in Hachioji on February 21, 1979. In 1993, when she was 14 years old, she debuted for Yomiuri Nippon Beleza (later Nippon TV Beleza). In 2000 season, she was selected MVP awards in L.League. She played for the club until 2001. From 2002, she played for Iga FC Kunoichi (2002-2005) and INAC Kobe Leonessa (2006-2009). She retired in 2009. She played 245 matches at 3 clubs in L.League and she was selected Best Eleven 3 times (1999, 2000 and 2008). In July 2013, she came back at AS Elfen Sayama FC (later AS Elfen Saitama) until end of 2014 season.

National team career
On May 17, 1998, when Hara was 18 years old, she debuted for Japan national team against United States. She was a member of Japan for 1999, 2007 World Cup and 2008 Summer Olympics. She played 42 games and scored 2 goals for Japan until 2008.

National team statistics

International goals

References

External links

 
 
http://www.soccerpunter.com/players/19388-Ayumi-Hara
http://www.ussoccer.com/stories/2015/07/05/09/34/150705-wnt-v-jpn-japan-in-focus

1979 births
Living people
Tama University alumni
Association football people from Tokyo
Japanese women's footballers
Japan women's international footballers
Nadeshiko League players
Nippon TV Tokyo Verdy Beleza players
Iga FC Kunoichi players
INAC Kobe Leonessa players
Chifure AS Elfen Saitama players
1999 FIFA Women's World Cup players
2007 FIFA Women's World Cup players
Olympic footballers of Japan
Footballers at the 2008 Summer Olympics
Women's association football midfielders
Nadeshiko League MVPs